Amma Kudineer (meaning Mother drinking-water in Tamil language) is a mineral water production and distribution project run by the Ministry of Water Resources, Government of Tamil Nadu in India.

About the scheme
The project was formally launched on 15 September 2013 by the then chief minister of Tamil Nadu J. Jayalalithaa, on the 105th birth anniversary of former chief minister of Tamil Nadu C. N. Annadurai.

The project involves production and packaging of mineral water in one litre plastic bottles, and selling them in long-distance running state-owned buses and in bus stations. The price has been fixed at ₹10 per bottle. The project is intended to make purified water available to people of all strata, at a reasonable cost.

The Indian Railways has been undertaken a similar scheme under the name "Rail neer" for some time now, with its one-litre bottles priced at ₹15, while private companies sell 1-litre bottles at higher prices.

The scheme is run by the Tamil Nadu State Transport Corporation, with a production plant in Gummidipoondi in Thiruvallur district, on a 55-acre land that belongs to the Institute of Road Transport (IRT), a subsidiary of the Tamil Nadu State Transport Corporation. The plant has the capacity to produce 3 lakh liters of purified water per day. The total dissolved solids (TDS) in the water is reported to be below 50 parts per million (ppm), as compared to a requirement of below 150 ppm in water from lakes and in rainwaters.

This scheme was a huge success and soon its sales was extended all over tamil nadu. within several days, the demand for water bottles touches peak which leads to shortage of water bottles at many places.

During disaster situations which occurred at kerala as 2018 kerala floods, 2015 chennai floods, gaja cyclone and during many other disaster time, amma water bottles played a major role and clears the thirst of many peoples under such tough situations.

Now the sales of Amma Water bottles are stopped completely due to a major technical problem at the Gummidipoondi Factory and there are also no plans to repair this plant by government due to change in ruling power.

See also
Amma Unavagam

References

Government welfare schemes in Tamil Nadu
Water in India
Bottled water brands
2013 establishments in Tamil Nadu